Liriomyza bryoniae is a species of leaf miner fly in the family Agromyzidae, native to northwestern Europe. It is an occasional pest of horticultural crops; host plants include tomatoes, cucumbers, melons, egg plants, potatoes and various other plants growing under glass or in the open.

References

Agromyzidae